The Malaboch War (1894) was between Chief Malaboch (Mmaleboho, Mmaleboxo) of the Bahananwa (Xananwa) people and the South African Republic (ZAR) Government led by Commandant-General Piet Joubert. Malboch refused to pay taxes to the Transvaal after it was given back to the Boers in 1881 by the British, which resulted in a military drive against him by the South African Republic (ZAR).

Background
The Malaboch war broke out when Chief Malaboch refused to leave his kingdom in Blouberg after being asked to leave by the government of South African Republic in April 1894. Piet Joubert led the Transvaal forces to an overwhelming victory leading to the surrender of the Bahananwa.

References

Conflicts in 1894
1894 in the South African Republic
Wars involving the South African Republic
African resistance to colonialism